Pimelea gigandra is a species of flowering plant in the family Thymelaeaceae and is endemic to eastern Australia. It is a shrub with densely hairy young stems, elliptic leaves and heads of 10 to 19 white, tube-shaped flowers.

Description
The upper surface of the leaves is sparsely hairy and the lower surface is sparsely to densely hairy. Flowering occurs throughout the year.

Taxonomy
Pimelea gigandra  was first formally described in 2017 by Anthony Bean in the journal Austrobaileya from specimens collected in Lamington National Park in 2016. The specific epithet (gigandra) is derived from Greek words meaning "large" or "giant" and "man" or "male", referring to the anthers that are larger than those of similar species.

Distribution and habitat
This pimelea is only known from near Mount Tamborine in south-east Queensland to Mororo in north-eastern New South Wales, where it grows in tall open forest and on the edges of rainforest.

References

gigandra
Flora of Queensland
Flora of New South Wales
Malvales of Australia
Plants described in 2017
Taxa named by Anthony Bean